Verneyablonovo is a rural locality (a selo) in Volokonovsky District, Belgorod Oblast, Russia. The population was 83 as of 2010. There are 2 streets.

Geography 
Verneyablonovo is located 15 km south of Volokonovka (the district's administrative centre) by road. Oskolishche is the nearest rural locality.

References 

Rural localities in Volokonovsky District